A list of films produced by the Marathi language film industry based in Maharashtra, released in the year 2017

Box office collection

January – March

April – June

July – September

October – December

References

External links
 Filmygiri It’s All About Marathi Films

2017
Marathi
2017 in Indian cinema